On 24 July 2019, a female suicide bomber entered and blew herself up inside Mogadishu Mayor Abdirahmean Omar Osman's office, during a security meeting, killing six government officials and injuring nine of Osman's staff. James Swan was the target of the attack, but Swan had met the mayor earlier, leaving before the blast occurred. Osman was critically wounded in the attack, and succumbed to his injuries a week later, on 1 August 2019, after having been transported to and hospitalised in Doha, Qatar. The attack was claimed by Al Shabaab. Seven people were killed, including Osman.

See also 
22 July 2019 Mogadishu bombing

References  

2010s in Mogadishu
2019 in Somalia
2019 murders in Somalia
24 July 2019 bombing
21st-century mass murder in Somalia
24 July 2019 bombing
Attacks on buildings and structures in 2019
24 July 2019 bombing
24 July 2019 bombing
Attacks on office buildings 
24 July 2019
Islamic terrorist incidents in 2019 
July 2019 crimes in Africa 
Mass murder in 2019
24 July 2019 bombing
Suicide bombings in 2019
24 July 2019 
Terrorist incidents in Somalia in 2019
Somali Civil War (2009–present)